Illinois Institute of Technology (IIT), commonly referred to as Illinois Tech, is a private research university in Chicago, Illinois. Tracing its history to 1890, the present name was adopted upon the merger of the Armour Institute and Lewis Institute in 1940. The university has programs in architecture, business, communications, design, engineering, industrial technology, information technology, law, psychology, and science. It is classified among "R2: Doctoral Universities – High research activity".

The university's historic roots are in several 19th-century engineering and professional education institutions in the United States. In the mid 20th century, it became closely associated with trends in modernist architecture through the work of its Dean of Architecture Ludwig Mies van der Rohe, who designed its campus. The Institute of Design, Chicago-Kent College of Law, and Midwest College of Engineering were also merged into Illinois Tech.

History

The Sermon and The Institute
In 1890, when advanced education was often reserved for society's elite, Chicago minister Frank Wakely Gunsaulus delivered what came to be known as the "Million Dollar Sermon." From the pulpit of his South Side church, near the site Illinois Institute of Technology now occupies, Gunsaulus said that with a million dollars he could build a school where students can learn to think in practical not theoretical terms; where they could be taught to "learn by doing."

Inspired by Gunsaulus' vision, Philip Danforth Armour, Sr. (1832–1901) gave $1 million to found the Armour Institute—and Armour, his wife, Malvina Belle Ogden Armour (1842–1927) and their son J. (Jonathan) Ogden Armour (1863–1927) continued to support the university in its early years. Armour claimed it was his best paying investment. When Armour Institute opened in 1893, it offered professional courses in engineering, chemistry, architecture and library science.

Illinois Tech was created in 1940 by the merger of Armour Institute and Lewis Institute. Located on the west side of Chicago, Lewis Institute, established in 1895 by the estate of hardware merchant and investor Allen C. Lewis, offered liberal arts as well as science and engineering courses for both men and women. At separate meetings held by their respective boards on October 26, 1939, the trustees of Armour and Lewis voted to merge the two colleges. A Cook County circuit court decision handed down on April 23, 1940 solidified the merger of the two schools into the Illinois Institute of Technology.

Mergers and changes
The Institute of Design (ID), founded in Chicago by László Moholy-Nagy in 1937, merged with Illinois Tech in 1949.

Chicago-Kent College of Law, founded in 1887, became part of the university in 1969, making Illinois Institute of Technology one of the few technology-based universities with a law school.

Also in 1969, the Stuart School of Management and Finance—now known as the Stuart School of Business – was established thanks to a gift from the estate of Lewis Institute alumnus and Chicago financier Harold Leonard Stuart. The program became the Stuart School of Business in 1999.

The Midwest College of Engineering, founded in 1967, joined the university in 1986, giving Illinois Tech a presence in west suburban Wheaton with what is today known as the Rice Campus.

In December 2006, the University Technology Park at Illinois Institute of Technology, an incubator and life sciences/tech start-up facility, was started in existing research buildings located on the south end of Mies Campus. , University Tech Park at Illinois Institute of Technology is home to many companies.

Today, Illinois Tech is a private, PhD-granting university with programs in engineering, science, human sciences, applied technology, architecture, business, design, and law. It is one of 23 institutions that comprise the Association of Independent Technological Universities (AITU).

Growth and expansion

Illinois Tech continued to expand after the merger. As one of the first American universities to host a Navy V-12 program during World War II the school saw a large increase in students and expanded the Armour campus beyond its original . Two years before the merger, German architect Ludwig Mies van der Rohe joined the then Armour Institute of Technology to head both Armour's and the Art Institute of Chicago's architecture program. The Art Institute would later separate and form its own program. Mies was given the task of designing a completely new campus, and the result was a spacious, open,  campus set in contrast to the busy, crowded urban neighborhood around it. The first Mies-designed buildings were completed in the mid-1940s, and construction on what is considered the "Mies Campus" continued until the early 1970s.

Engineering and research also saw great growth and expansion from the post-war period until the early 1970s. Illinois Tech experienced its greatest period of growth from 1952 to 1973 under President John T. Rettaliata, a fluid dynamicist whose research accomplishments included work on early development of the jet engine and a seat on the National Aeronautics and Space Council. This period saw Illinois Tech as the largest engineering school in the United States, as stated in a feature in the September 1953 issue of Popular Science magazine. Illinois Tech housed many research organizations: IIT Research Institute (formerly Armour Research Foundation and birthplace of magnetic recording wire and tape as well as audio and video cassettes), the Institute of Gas Technology, and the American Association of Railroads, among others.

Three colleges merged with Illinois Tech after the 1940 Armor/Lewis merger: Institute of Design in 1949, Chicago-Kent College of Law in 1969, and Midwest College of Engineering in 1986. Illinois Tech's Stuart School of Business was founded by a gift from Lewis Institute alumnus Harold Leonard Stuart in 1969, and joined Chicago-Kent at Illinois Tech's Downtown Campus in 1992; it phased out its undergraduate program (becoming graduate-only) after spring 1995. (An undergraduate business program focusing on technology and entrepreneurship was launched in fall 2004 and was for a while administratively separate from the Stuart School. It is now part of the school, but remains on Main Campus.) The Institute of Design, once housed on the Mies Campus in S.R. Crown Hall, also phased out its undergraduate programs and moved downtown in the early 1990s.

Although not used in official communication, the nickname "Illinois Tech" has long been a favorite of students, inspiring the name of the student newspaper; (renamed in 1928 from Armour Tech News to TechNews), and the former mascot of the university's collegiate sports teams, the Techawks. During the 1950s and 1960s, the nickname was actually more prevalent than "IIT." This was reflected by the Chicago Transit Authority's Green Line rapid transit station at 35th and State being named "Tech-35th", but has since been changed to "35th-Bronzeville-IIT." In the 2010s, school administrators began a move to reintroduce the "Illinois Tech" nickname, to decrease confusion with the Indian Institutes of Technology that share the IIT abbreviation and with ITT Technical Institute whose abbreviation is similar.

In June 2020 Illinois Tech launched the College of Computing and the revamped Lewis College of Science and Letters. The College of Computing houses the computer science, applied mathematics, and information technology and management departments, as well as the industrial technology and management program. The revamped Lewis College added the biology, chemistry, food science and nutrition, and physics departments to the remaining humanities, psychology, and social science departments. With the launch of the College of Computing and revamped Lewis College of Science and Letters, the School of Applied Technology and College of Science were dissolved.

Today

In 1994 the National Commission on IIT considered leaving Mies Campus and moving to the Chicago suburbs. Construction of a veritable wall of Chicago Housing Authority high-rises replaced virtually all of Illinois Tech's neighbors in the 1950s and 1960s, a well-meaning but flawed attempt to improve conditions in an economically declining portion of the city. The closest high-rise, Stateway Gardens, was located just south of the Illinois Tech campus boundary, the last building of which was demolished in 2006. But the Dearborn Homes to the immediate north of campus still remain. The past decade has seen a redevelopment of Stateway Gardens into a new, mixed-income neighborhood dubbed Park Boulevard; the completion of the new central station of the Chicago Police Department a block east of the campus; and major commercial development at Roosevelt Road, just north of the campus, and residential development as close as Michigan Avenue on the east boundary of the school.

Bolstered by a $120 million gift in the mid-1990s from Illinois Tech alumnus Robert Pritzker, former chairman of IIT's board of trustees, and Robert Galvin, former chairman of the board and former Motorola executive, the university has benefited from a revitalization. The first new buildings on Mies Campus since the "completion" of the Mies Campus in the early 1970s were finished in 2003—Rem Koolhaas's McCormick Tribune Campus Center and Helmut Jahn's State Street Village. S. R. Crown Hall, a National Historic Landmark, saw renovation in 2005 and the renovation of Wishnick Hall was completed in 2007. Undergraduate enrollment has breached 3,000. To further boost their focus on biotechnology and the melding of business and technology, University Technology Park at Illinois Tech, an expansive research park, has been developed by remodeling former Institute of Gas Technology and research buildings on the south end of Mies Campus.

Academics

Academic units
Illinois Tech is divided into five colleges (College of Computing, Armour College of Engineering, Lewis College of Science and Letters, College of Architecture, Chicago-Kent College of Law), an institute (Institute of Design), one school (Stuart School of Business), and a number of research centers, some of which provide academic programs independent of the other academic units. While many maintain undergraduate programs, some only offer graduate or certificate programs.

In 2003 Illinois Tech administrators split the former Armour College of Engineering and Science into two colleges known as the Armour College of Engineering and the College of Science and Letters. The Armour College of Engineering is composed of five departments: the Department of Biomedical Engineering, the Department of Biological and Chemical Engineering, the Department of Civil, Architectural and Environmental Engineering, the Department of Mechanical, Materials and Aerospace Engineering, and the Department of Computer and Electrical Engineering.

In 2013, Illinois Tech administrators reorganized the College of Science and Letters and Institute of Psychology, forming the College of Science (Department of Applied Mathematics, the Department of Biology, the Department of Chemistry, the Department of Physics, the Department of Computer Science, and the Department of Mathematics and Science Education), and the Lewis College of Human Sciences (the Department of Humanities, the Department of Psychology, and the Department of Social Sciences).

The Institute of Design was founded in 1937 as the New Bauhaus: Chicago School of Design by László Moholy-Nagy. It became known as the Institute of Design in 1944 and later joined Illinois Institute of Technology in 1949.

Illinois Tech also contains the College of Architecture. This college began in 1895 when trustees of Armour Institute and Art Institute merged the architectural programs of both schools to form the Chicago School of Architecture of Armour Institute.

The School of Applied Technology was founded as the Center for Professional Development in 2001 to provide technology oriented education for working professionals. In December 2009 Illinois Tech announced the formation of the School of Applied Technology, composed of undergraduate and graduate degree programs in Industrial Technology and Management (INTM) and Information Technology and Management (ITM), as well as non-credit Professional Learning Programs (PLP). These programs were all formerly part of the Center for Professional Development. Professional Learning Programs offers noncredit continuing education courses and certificates, corporate training, a Professional Engineering Exam Review program, international programs including English as a Second Language instruction, short courses and seminars ranging from a few hours to several days in length. In 2014 the Department of Food Science and Nutrition was formally launched within the School of Applied Technology, formed from degree programs originating within Illinois Tech's Institute for Food Safety and Health (IFSH). The School of Applied Technology was dissolved in June 2020; its departments and programs remained, split between the new College of Computing and Lewis College of Science and Letters.

Chicago-Kent College of Law began in 1886 with law clerks receiving tutorials from Appellate Judge Joseph M. Bailey to prepare for the newly instated Illinois Bar Examination. By 1888 these evening sessions developed into formal classes and the Chicago College of Law was established. It was not until 1969 that the school was incorporated into Illinois Institute of Technology.

With a bequest from Illinois Tech alumnus and financier Harold Leonard Stuart the Stuart School of Business was established in 1969. In addition to the M.B.A. and PhD, Stuart offers specialized programs in Finance, Mathematical Finance (provided in conjunction with the Illinois Tech Department of Applied Mathematics), Environmental Management and Sustainability (provided in conjunction with the Chicago-Kent College of Law and Department of Civic, Architectural, and Environmental Engineering), Marketing Analytics, and Public Administration. The PhD program in Management Science offers specializations in Finance and Analytics.

Illinois Tech also offers many dual admission programs including programs in medicine, optometry, pharmacy, law, and business.

Rankings and recognition

Illinois Tech was featured on Princeton Review's 2014 list of 378 best colleges in the United States and on its list of Best Midwest Colleges.
Illinois Tech was ranked as a tier 1 university being the 122nd best university nationally (climbing seven places up from the previous year), and the third best university in the Chicago metropolitan area (after the University of Chicago and Northwestern University), based on U.S. News & World Reports "Best Colleges 2019."
Illinois Tech was featured as No. 24 on Newsweeks College Rankings 2012: Most Rigorous Schools list.
Illinois Tech was ranked the 72nd best graduate school for engineering in U.S. News & World Report's "Best Graduate Schools 2014."
Chicago-Kent was ranked as a tier 1 law school being the 68th best law school nationally (5th in Trial Advocacy, 11th in Intellectual Property Law, and 21st in Part-time Law) based on U.S. News & World Report."
According to the U.S. News & World Report, Illinois Tech's Aerospace Engineering was ranked 21, Materials Engineering was ranked 59, Chemical Engineering was ranked 60 and Biomedical Engineering was ranked 61.
 Illinois Tech was designated in 2015 as a National Center of Academic Excellence in Cyber Defense Education by the U.S. Department of Homeland Security and the National Security Agency, acknowledging the substantial focus on cybersecurity and digital forensics in formal degrees, certificates, and specializations in programs offered by the College of Computing.

Campus organization

Illinois Tech has four campuses.

The main campus is located at 10 West 35th Street in Chicago's Bronzeville neighborhood and houses all undergraduate programs and graduate programs in engineering, sciences, architecture, communications, and psychology. The downtown campus, which was renamed the Conviser Law Center in early 2020, at 565 West Adams Street in Chicago houses Chicago-Kent College of Law, Stuart School of Business, and the graduate programs in Public Administration. The Daniel F. and Ada L. Rice Campus in Wheaton, Illinois houses some degree programs in Information Technology and Management. This  campus opened its doors in January 1991. Moffett Campus in Bedford Park, Illinois, is home to the Institute for Food Safety and Health. Moffett Campus was donated to Illinois Tech by CPC International Inc. in 1988.

VanderCook College of Music shares Illinois Tech's Main Campus: VanderCook College of Music and offers cross-registration for Illinois Tech students.

Also known as the Black Metropolis District, the area is a landmark in African-American history. Following rapid growth during the Great Migration of African-Americans from the south between 1910 and 1920, it became home to numerous African-American owned businesses and cultural institutions and offered an alternative to the race restrictions that were prevalent in the rest of the city. The area was home to author Gwendolyn Brooks, civil rights activist Ida B. Wells, bandleader Louis Armstrong, pilot Bessie Coleman and many other famous African-Americans during the mid-20th century. The church where Emmett Till's funeral was held is less than a mile south of the campus. The nine extant structures from the period during the Great Migration when the area became known as the Black Metropolis District were added jointly to the National Register of Historic Places in 1986 and designated a Chicago Landmark in 1998.

In 1941, the Chicago Housing Authority began erecting massive public housing developments in the area. By 1990, the Illinois Tech campus was encircled by high-rise housing projects rife with crime. The projects were demolished beginning in 1999, and the area began to revitalize, with major renovations to King Drive and many of the historic structures and an influx of new, upscale, housing developments. Neighborhood features include Guaranteed Rate Field—home of the Chicago White Sox—Burnham Park, and 31st Street Beach on the Lake Michigan waterfront, and historical buildings from the heyday of the Black Metropolis era, including the Chicago Bee Building, the Eighth Regiment Armory, and the Overton Hygienic Building. The campus is bordered on the west by the Chicago 'L' Red Line, which runs parallel to Lake Michigan north to Rogers Park and south to 95th street. The Green Line bisects the campus and runs north to the Loop and then west to the near west suburbs and south to the Museum Campus and the University of Chicago.

Today, Illinois Tech continues to support the Historic Bronzeville area by sponsoring non-for-profits such as The Renaissance Collaborative.

Architecture

The campus, roughly bounded between 31st and 35th streets, Michigan Avenue, and the Dan Ryan Expressway, was designed by modernist architect Ludwig Mies van der Rohe, "one of the great figures of 20th-century architecture," who chaired the IIT School of Architecture from 1938 to 1958. Van der Rohe's master plan for the Illinois Tech campus was one of the most ambitious projects he ever conceived and the campus, with 20 of his works, is the greatest concentration of his buildings in the world. The layout of the campus departs radically from "traditional college quadrangles and limestone buildings". The materials are inspired by the factories and warehouses of Chicago's South Side and "embod[y] 20th century methods and materials: steel and concrete frames with curtain walls of brick and glass." The campus was landscaped by van der Rohe's close colleague at Illinois Tech, Alfred Caldwell, "the last representative of the Prairie School of landscape architects." Known as "the nature poet", Caldwell's plan reinforced van der Rohe's design with "landscaping planted in a free-flowing manner, which in its interaction with the pristine qualities of the architecture, introduce[d] a poetic aspect."

On the west side of Mies Campus are three red brick buildings that were original to Armour Institute, built between 1891 and 1901. In 1938 Ludwig Mies van der Rohe began his 20-year tenure as director of IIT's School of Architecture (1938–1959). The university was on the verge of building a brand new campus, to be one of the nation's first federally funded urban renewal projects. Mies was given carte blanche in the large commission, and the university grew fast enough during and after World War II to allow much of the new plan to be realized. From 1943 to 1957, several new Mies buildings rose across campus, including the S.R. Crown Hall, which houses the architecture school, and was designated a National Historic Landmark in 2001.

Although Mies had emphasized his wish to complete the campus he had begun, commissions from the late 50s onward were given to Skidmore, Owings & Merrill (SOM), prompting Mies to never return to the campus that had changed architecture the world over. SOM architect Walter Netsch designed a few buildings, including the new library that Mies had wished to create, all of them similar to Mies's style. By the late 1960s, campus addition projects were given to SOM's Myron Goldsmith, who had worked with Mies during his education at Illinois Tech and thus was able to design several new buildings to harmonize well with the original campus. In 1976, the American Institute of Architects recognized the campus as one of the 200 most significant works of architecture in the United States. The new campus center, designed by Rem Koolhaas, and a new state-of-the-art residence hall designed by Helmut Jahn, State Street Village, opened in 2003. These were the first new buildings built on the Main Campus in 32 years. Illinois Tech opened its first new academic building in nearly 40 years in October 2018, when it dedicated the Ed Kaplan Family Institute for Innovation and Tech Entrepreneurship.

In 1976, American Institute of Architects named the Illinois Tech campus one of the 200 most significant works of architecture in the United States. Mies Campus was added to the National Register of Historic Places in 2005.

Sustainability
In 2010 Illinois Tech received the Princeton Review's highest sustainability rating among universities in Illinois, tied with the University of Illinois at Urbana–Champaign.

Notable buildings

S. R. Crown Hall
S. R. Crown Hall, erected in 1955, was considered by Mies to be one of his greatest architectural achievements. To provide for a flexible, columnless interior, he suspended the roof from four steel girders supported by eight external columns spaced 60 feet apart. S. R. Crown Hall, home to Illinois Tech's College of Architecture, has been described as an "immortal contribution to the architecture of Chicago and the world." S. R. Crown Hall was granted National Historic Landmark status in 2001. A $15 million renovation, completed in August 2005, modernized the structure with energy-saving mechanicals and windows, along with needed technology upgrades for computers and the Internet—all while carefully preserving the architectural integrity of the building, inside and out. Additional improvements were completed in 2013.

State Street Village
State Street Village (SSV), a student residence hall designed by Murphy/Jahn architects on the southeast corner of 33rd and State Streets just south of the campus center, was completed in August 2003. Helmut Jahn, who studied architecture at Illinois Tech under Mies van der Rohe in the late 1960s, is responsible for the innovative design of the residence hall. The structure is composed of three separate five-story buildings, joined by exterior glass walls that muffle noise from passing trains on the adjacent "L" tracks. SSV houses 367 students in apartment-style and suite-style units.

McCormick Tribune Campus Center (MTCC)
The McCormick Tribune Campus Center (MTCC) at 33rd and State Streets opened in September 2003. Designed by Dutch architect Rem Koolhaas, considered one of the "10 most influential living architects by the American Institute of Architects," the campus center arranges various areas around diagonal pathways, resembling interior streets, that are extensions of the paths students use to cross the campus. The design includes a concrete and stainless steel tube that encloses a 530-foot stretch of the Green Line elevated commuter rail ("L") tracks, passing directly over the one-story campus center building. The tube dampens the sound of trains overhead as students enjoy food courts, student organization offices, retail shops, a recreational facility and campus events.

Ed Kaplan Family Institute for Innovation and Tech Entrepreneurship

The newest addition to the Mies Campus came from Chicago architect, and College of Architecture professor John Ronan, who was selected to design the Ed Kaplan Family Institute for Innovation and Tech Entrepreneurship. Ronan's building, the first new academic building in more than 40 years, was completed in 2018. In 2019, the Kaplan Center won the American Institute of Architects Chicago Chapter' s highest architectural design award.

Campuses
Illinois Institute of Technology has four campuses in the Chicago area. A portion of the 120-acre Main Campus, identified as the Illinois Institute of Technology Academic Campus, was entered onto the National Register of Historic Places in 2005. The complete 120-acre campus, also known as the Mies Campus, was designed by Ludwig Mies van der Rohe, universally considered one of the 20th century's most influential architects and the director of the architecture program at Illinois Tech from 1938 to 1958. In 1976, the American Institute of Architects recognized the Illinois Tech main campus, centered at 33rd and State Streets in Chicago, as one of the 200 most significant works of architecture in the United States.  S. R. Crown Hall, home of Illinois Tech's College of Architecture, was named a National Historic Landmark in 2001.

The Illinois Institute of Technology Academic Campus undertook a series of projects with Peter Lindsay Schaudt Landscape Architecture, Inc. (now Hoerr Schaudt) in 2000 to revitalize the historic campus. Keeping in spirit with the original design of landscape architect Alfred Caldwell (1903–1998) who worked closely with van der Rohe, the landscape architects at Peter Lindsay Schaudt played upon his concept of horizontality and favored a native plant palette. The projects created cohesive formal and informal spaces for students and faculty to relax and gather that honor the connection between the original architecture and landscape architecture. The projects included State Street Boulevard, Crown Hall, Federal Street, State Street Village, a planting restoration for Crown Hall, the IITRI Tower Renovation, and the IIT Research Park. Upon their completion in 2005, the firm Peter Lindsay Schaudt submitted the projects as a single entry for the National ASLA design competition, winning the General Design Award of Honor.

The 10-story Downtown Campus at 565 West Adams Street, designed by Gerald Horn of Holabird & Root and built by Illinois Tech in 1992, is home to Illinois Tech's Chicago-Kent College of Law and Institute of Design (ID), as well as the downtown campus for the Stuart School of Business. The Downtown Campus was renamed the Conviser Law Center in early 2020. The Institute of Design has re-located to the Ed Kaplan Family Institute for Innovation and Tech Entrepreneurship on the Mies Campus.

The 19-acre Daniel F. and Ada L. Rice Campus in west suburban Wheaton, designed by Solomon Cordwell Buenz & Associates, Inc. for Illinois Tech and dedicated in 1990, offers graduate programs, upper-level undergraduate courses, and continuing professional education.

The five-acre Moffett Campus in southwest suburban Bedford Park was designed in 1947 by Schmidt, Garden, and Erickson and was donated to Illinois Tech in 1988. It houses the Institute for Food Safety and Health (IFSH), which includes the National Center for Food Safety and Technology, a unique consortium of government, industry, and academic partners.

Student life

There are numerous student organizations available on campus, including religious groups, academic groups, and student activity groups.

Three of Illinois Tech's major student organizations serve the entire student body: the Student Government Association (SGA), the Student Union Board (UB), and TechNews. SGA is the governing student body and acts as a liaison between university administration and the student body, serves as a forum to express student opinion, and provides certain services to student organizations such as official recognition and distribution of funds. Union Board serves as the main event programming group and plans more than 180 on- and off-campus events for students annually. Founded in 1938 UB is responsible for the emergence of the school spirit and booster group Scarlet Fever. TechNews is the campus paper and serves as a news outlet for campus interests and as another outlet for student opinion in both a weekly paper edition and online format; it has existed since at least the 1930s.

Illinois Tech hosts a campus radio station, WIIT, with a radio studio in The McCormick Tribune Campus Center. WIIT was originally an AM radio station through the 1960s, using the name WIIT Radio 64.  It was simulcast on AM 640 and stereo FM 88.9 by the end of January 1972. The station was forced to change its callsign to WOUI in 1972 because WIIT was similar to WAIT (AM).  After the WAIT callsign was dropped, the IIT station eventually returned to its original call letters, WIIT, on February 23, 2001.

In September 2007 the university opened a nine-hole disc golf course that weaves around the academic buildings on Mies Campus and is the first disc golf course to appear within the Chicago city limits.

In anticipation of the opening of The McCormick Tribune Campus Center, the on-campus pub and bowling alley known as "The Bog" ceased operations in 2003. However, in response to students, faculty, and staff who missed the former campus hangout, The Bog reopened in February 2007 and is now open every Thursday and Friday night offering bowling, billiards, table tennis, and video games. The Bog is also home to the campus bar, which serves beer and wine, and hosts weekly events such as comedians, live bands, or karaoke nights on its stage.

In fall 2007, the third generation of a cappella groups was formed, The TechTonics, a coed group of students. Within a year the organization expanded and now includes an all-male group, the Crown Joules, and an all-female group, the X-Chromotones. IIT A Cappella performs a variety of shows on campus as well as off campus and in the midwest. They perform shows at the end of each semester which showcase everything they have learned.

Illinois Institute of Technology Mies (Main) Campus has an established Greek System, which consists of seven Illinois Tech fraternities (and one VanderCook College of Music fraternity) and three sororities. Fraternities Pi Kappa Phi, Delta Tau Delta, Alpha Sigma Phi, Phi Kappa Sigma, Sigma Phi Epsilon and Triangle Fraternity and sororities Kappa Phi Delta, and Alpha Sigma Alpha have chapter houses on The Quad. The Omega Delta fraternity do not.

Athletics 

The Illinois Tech (IIT) athletic teams are called the Scarlet Hawks. The university is a member of the Division III level of the National Collegiate Athletic Association (NCAA), primarily competing in the Northern Athletics Collegiate Conference (NACC) since the 2018–19 academic year; coinciding with the program's acceptance as a full NCAA Division III member. The Scarlet Hawks previously competed in the Division I level of the National Association of Intercollegiate Athletics (NAIA), primarily competing in the Chicagoland Collegiate Athletic Conference (CCAC) until after the 2012–13 season, as well as a member of the United States Collegiate Athletic Association (USCAA), until the athletic program completed the transition to NCAA Division III after the 2017–18 season (which competed during five seasons as an NCAA D-III Independent during its provisional member status from 2013–14 to 2017–18).

Illinois Tech competes in 19 intercollegiate varsity sports: Men's sports include baseball, basketball, cross country, lacrosse, soccer, swimming & diving, tennis, track & field (indoor and outdoor) and volleyball; while women's sports include basketball, cross country, lacrosse, soccer, swimming & diving, tennis, track & field (indoor and outdoor) and volleyball.

Basketball
Illinois Tech discontinued its men's and women's basketball programs after the 2008–09 season, but re-instated them beginning with the 2012–13 season. The men's basketball team played in its first USCAA Division I Championship in March 2017. Although the team lost to Concordia Alabama, the Scarlet Hawks finished the season at 22–6. Illinois Tech also has a cricket team as a part of non-varsity sports level that competes in Division II of the Midwest Cricket Conference.

Notable people

Faculty (current and former)
 Chaudhary Ajit Singh, former Indian Minister of Agriculture, Commerce and Industry and Civil Aviation  
 Virgil Abloh, fashion designer (Creative Director for Louis Vuitton and Founder of Off-White x Nike), entrepreneur, DJ
 John L. Anderson, professor of chemical engineering
 Lori Andrews, professor of law
 Wiel Arets, professor of architecture
 Shlomo Argamon, professor of computer science
 Carol Ross Barney, adjunct professor of architecture
 John F. O. Bilson, professor of finance, dean of Stuart School of Business
 Harry Callahan, professor of photography
 Cosmo Campoli, professor of sculpture 
 Patrick Corrigan, professor of psychology
 Michael Davis, professor of philosophy
 Martin Felsen, associate professor of architecture
 Lance Fortnow, dean of the College of Computing
 Susan Fromberg Schaeffer, assistant professor of English
 Lois Graham, professor of mechanical engineering
 S. I. Hayakawa, professor of English
 Mar Hicks, associate professor of history of technology 
 Fazlur Khan, adjunct professor of structural engineering
 Albert Henry Krehbiel, professor of art
 Walter McCrone, professor of microscopy and materials science
 Karl Menger, professor of mathematics
 László Moholy-Nagy, professor of design
 Art Paul, designer, creator of Playboy logo
 Walter Peterhans, taught 'visual training' course for architecture students
 Sonja Petrović, associate professor of applied mathematics
 Nambury S. Raju, professor of psychology
 Edward Reingold, professor of computer science and applied mathematics
 Ludwig Mies van der Rohe, professor of architecture
 John Ronan, professor of architecture
 Mohammad Shahidehpour, Bodine Chair professor of electrical and computer engineering
 Tamara Goldman Sher, professor of psychology
 Arthur Siegel, professor of photography
 Aaron Siskind, professor of photography
 Nellie Bangs Skelton, professor of piano
 Abe Sklar, professor of applied mathematics
 Susan Solomon, discover the hole in ozone layer, leader in Atmospheric Chemistry, inducted in National's Women Hall of Fame
 Robert Bruce Tague, professor of architecture
 David Tannor (born 1958), theoretical chemist, Hermann Mayer Professorial Chair in the Department of Chemical Physics at the Weizmann Institute of Science
 John Henry Waddell, professor of sculpture and art

Nobel laureates 
 Leon M. Lederman, professor of physics; Nobel laureate in physics (1988); director emeritus of Fermilab; founded the Illinois Mathematics and Science Academy 
 Herbert A. Simon, professor of psychology; political, economic, psychological and computer science polymath; Nobel laureate in economics (1978) 
 Jack Steinberger, physicist; Nobel laureate in physics (1988); studied chemical engineering at Armour Institute of Technology but his scholarship ended and he had to leave

See also
 Architecture of Chicago
 Chicago–Kent College of Law
 IIT Physics Department
 IIT Research Institute (IITRI)
 McCormick Tribune Campus Center

References

External links

 
 Official athletics website
 Finding aid for the IIT – New Campus Center Competition fonds, Canadian Centre for Architecture.

 
Engineering universities and colleges in Illinois
Technological universities in the United States
Universities and colleges in Chicago
South Side, Chicago
Universities and colleges in DuPage County, Illinois
1890 establishments in Illinois
Educational institutions established in 1890
USCAA member institutions
Private universities and colleges in Illinois
Douglas, Chicago